Philinus may refer to:

Philinus of Agrigentum (3rd century BC), historian who accompanied Hannibal in his campaigns against Rome
Philinus of Athens (4th century BC), orator 
Philinus of Cos (3rd century BC), physician - reputed founder of the Empiric school
Philinus of Cos (athlete) (3rd century BC), athlete and five times Olympic winner